Sophie Aldred (born 20 August 1962) is an English actress and television presenter. She has worked extensively in children's television as a presenter and voice artist. She played the Seventh Doctor's companion, Ace, in the television series Doctor Who during the late 1980s, becoming the final companion in the series' first run.

Early life
Aldred was born in Greenwich, London, but grew up in nearby Blackheath. She sang in the church choir of St James', Kidbrooke, and attended Blackheath High School from 1973 until 1980. She then enrolled as a drama student at the University of Manchester. She graduated in 1983 and decided to embark on a career in children's theatre. She also sang in working men's clubs around Manchester.

Career
In 1987, Aldred was cast as Ace in Doctor Who, initially for Dragonfire, the final story of the twenty-fourth season. Her tenure on the show spanned the last nine stories of the programme's original run, which ended in 1989.

In January 1992, she guest-starred in More than a Messiah, one of the videos in the series The Stranger, starring Colin Baker, also formerly of Doctor Who.

Both before and since Doctor Who, Aldred has had a varied and busy television career, particularly in children's programming, where she has presented educational programmes under the name "Sophie Socket" such as Corners, Melvin and Maureen's Music-a-grams (which ran from 1992 to '96), Tiny and Crew (which she presented, 1995–96), the BBC series Words and Pictures (1992, 1996-2001), and also the CITV paranormal show It's a Mystery in 1996. She also played the character Minnie The Mini Magician from series 8 onwards in CITV's ZZZap! between 1999 and 2001.

Aldred has presented and sung in several BBC Schools Radio series, including Singing Together, Music Workshop, Time and Tune and Music Box. She has also performed on radio and in the theatre. She has also reprised her role as Ace in the 1993 thirtieth-anniversary charity special Dimensions in Time and, since 2000, the Doctor Who audio plays produced by Big Finish Productions. Following the start of rumours in 1994 and 1995, avid Doctor Who fans expressed hope that Aldred would reprise her role in the project that would become the 1996 Doctor Who television movie, but she did not appear, and her character's fate was not mentioned.

Throughout the 2000s she has worked extensively as a voice-over artist for television advertisements, and has also provided voices for animated series such as Bob the Builder, Sergeant Stripes, the UK dubbed version of the CGI animated version of the Australian TV series Bananas in Pyjamas, El Nombre, Peter Rabbit, Noddy in Toyland, The Magic Key and Dennis & Gnasher.

She co-wrote with Mike Tucker the hardcover nonfiction book Ace, The Inside Story of the End of An Era, published by Virgin Publishing in 1996..

Aldred provided voices for the 2009 series Dennis and Gnasher, including that of title character Dennis the Menace.

She was also a former presenter of the 1996 CITV Saturday morning magazine programme WOW!.

Since 2012 Aldred has provided the voice of Tom in Tree Fu Tom, a CBeebies series. The series' other main voice actor, David Tennant (who voices Twigs), previously played the tenth incarnation of the Doctor in Doctor Who. In November 2013 she appeared in the one-off fiftieth-anniversary comedy homage The Five(ish) Doctors Reboot. In 2018, Aldred reprised the role of Ace in an audio drama set during the first season of Class.

In 2019, Aldred reprised the role of Ace in a special announcement trailer for the Doctor Who Season 26 Blu-ray box set. That same year, she also appeared as Mistress Na in the direct-to-DVD film Sil and the Devil Seeds of Arodor; a role for which she won Best Supporting Actress at the Accolade Competition in 2020.

In 2020, Aldred released the novel Doctor Who: At Childhood's End, where an older Ace (now a philanthropist) meets the Thirteenth Doctor and her companions while investigating an alien satellite.

Aldred reprised the role of Ace in the October 2022 Doctor Who BBC Centenary special "The Power of the Doctor" alongside Janet Fielding as Tegan Jovankawho was also a companion of The Doctor during the series' original run.

Personal life
Aldred had an affair with comedian Les Dennis during his first marriage. She married television presenter and actor Vince Henderson on 12 July 1997. They have two sons: Adam and William. Aldred is a vegan.

Filmography

Television

Video games

References

External links

 
 
 
 
 BBC Norfolk interview: Sophie Aldred – Feb '08

1962 births
20th-century English actresses
21st-century English actresses
Actresses from London
Alumni of the Victoria University of Manchester
English radio actresses
English stage actresses
English television actresses
English television presenters
English voice actresses
Living people
People educated at Blackheath High School
People from Greenwich